Korla Licheng Airport  is an airport serving Korla, a city in the autonomous region of Xinjiang in the People's Republic of China.

Facilities
It has one runway designated 04/22 which measures .

Airlines and destinations

See also
 List of airports in the People's Republic of China

References

External links
 

Airports in Xinjiang
Airport